Amyl chloride may refer to any of the monochlorinated derivatives of the isomers of pentane.  They have the molecular formula C5H11Cl.

 tert-Amyl chloride
 1-Chloropentane (n-amyl chloride)
 2-Chloropentane
 3-Chloropentane
 1-Chloro-3-methylbutane (isoamyl chloride)